Raleigh Vallen Airstrip  is an airstrip serving the Central Suriname Nature Reserve, Suriname. The runway is on Fungu Tabiki, an island in the Coppename River.

The airstrip is an entry and/or exit point for many nature hiking tours to the cascading Raleigh Falls and to Voltzberg, one of several black granite monoliths in the Central Suriname Nature Reserve.

Charters and destinations 
Charter Airlines serving this airport are:

See also

 List of airports in Suriname
 Transport in Suriname

References

External links
Tour of Raleighvallen and Voltzberg
Blue Wing landing at Raleighvallen

Airports in Suriname